Sofiya Dmitrievna Shishkina (born 30 September 1998) is a Russian footballer who plays for Zvezda-2005 Perm as a forward and has appeared for the Russia women's national team.

Career
Shishkina has been capped for the Russia national team, appearing for the team during the 2019 FIFA Women's World Cup qualifying cycle.

References

External links
 
 
 

1998 births
Living people
Russian women's footballers
Russia women's international footballers
Women's association football forwards
Zvezda 2005 Perm players